Listrac-Médoc is a commune in the Gironde department in the Nouvelle-Aquitaine region in southwestern France.

Geography
The commune is situated in the Médoc on the Route nationale 215, between Bordeaux and Le Verdon-sur-Mer.

Population

Wine
In a region where a mere  can be the difference between a great wine and an average one, its distance from the beneficial effect of the Garonne means that its wines are not as highly rated as those of the other appellations. Nonetheless it is home to many vineyards whose blends of cabernet sauvignon, merlot and cabernet franc can age over a long period.

See also
Communes of the Gironde department

References

External links 

 Listrac-Médoc on the site of Insee 

Communes of Gironde